is a Japanese children's television program broadcast by NHK Educational TV. It is the 3rd NHK puppet variety show overall, the first one being Hotch Potch Station, and the second was Quintet.

Introduction
The show includes both puppets and people. The show consists of interwoven stories surrounding a bookstore on the outskirts of Tokyo.

Characters
Kessaku Hirazumi (Kenichiro Tanimoto)
The only human in the show, Kessaku works in a bookstore named 'Hibi Hanseido'. He is a kind-hearted friend of Shiori. He loves music and can play the guitar.
Shiori Novel (Fumiko Orikasa)
Shiori is the main female protagonist, age 21. She manages the network of the 'Hibi Hanseido'. She is the granddaughter of Mokuji. She can be self-centered. She wants to take over running the store someday. She can play the flute.
Mokuji Novel (Ryūsei Nakao)
Mokuji is the master of 'Hibi Hanseido' whose nickname is Mokujī, age 70. He owns the old book section. He loves the store. He is an old-fashioned, energetic 70-year-old man with plenty of curiosity. He can play the accordion.
Goji and Datsuji (Hiroyuki Amano)
Goji and Datsuji are identical twins, ages 23. They visit 'Hibi Hanseido' everyday, and also operate a fan club for Shiori. They live in a big mansion. Goji can play the sax, Datsuji can play percussion.
Lylic (Rinko Urashima)
Lylic is a gray cat who can speak to Kessaku and sings. She always goes to the cats' meeting. Kessaku and the viewers are the only people who can hear her talk.

Original songs
The show features original songs, written by Takayuki Hattori and Keisuke Yamakawa. Here are some of them.

"Let's go to the Ihatov"
"I feel good from this morning" [朝からいい気分]
"The lost children in the picture book forest" [絵本の森の迷子たち]
"The memorial bookstore"
"Clown's tear is konpeitou" [ピエロの涙は金平糖]
"Goodbye, teddy bear" [さよならテディ・ベア]
"The cat knows everything" [猫はなんでも知っている]
"I wanna be a rainbow" [虹になりたい]
"Taiyaki is baked" [タイ焼き焼いた]
"Be fine tomorrow" [あした天気に・元気になあれ]

External links
 

Japanese children's television series
Japanese television shows featuring puppetry
NHK original programming
Television series by Sony Pictures Television
2011 Japanese television series debuts
2016 Japanese television series endings